During the 2007–08 season, AFC Ajax participated in the Eredivisie, the KNVB Cup, UEFA Champions League and the UEFA Cup. The first training took place on 5 July 2007. The traditional AFC Ajax Open Day was on 8 August.

Pre-season
The first training for the 2007–08 season was held on 5 July 2007. In preparation for the new season, Ajax organized a training camp in De Lutte at the De Thij Sportpark. During the pre-season, the squad played friendly matches against VVSB, GFC, Quick '20 and Go Ahead Eagles before traveling to Scotland to play against Rangers and Falkirk. They then returned to Amsterdam to play Atlético Madrid and Arsenal in the annual Amsterdam Tournament.

Player statistics 
Appearances for competitive matches only

|-
|colspan="14"|Players sold or loaned out after the start of the season:

|}
As of 14 November 2011

# Nicolae Mitea was issued shirt number 23 at the beginning of the season, however he sat out the season due to injury and was never issued a new shirt number.

2007–08 selection by nationality

Team statistics

Eredivisie standings

Points by match day

Total points by match day

Standing by match day

Goals by match day

2007–08 statistics
This is an overview of all the statistics for played matches in the 2007-08 season.

2007-08 team records

Top scorers

Placements

 Klaas-Jan Huntelaar finishes as topscorer of the Eredivisie with 33 goals in 34 matches.
 Maarten Stekelenburg is voted Player of the Year by the supporters of AFC Ajax.
 Jan Vertonghen is voted Talent of the Year by the supporters of AFC Ajax.
 John Heitinga is voted Dutch Footballer of the Year by De Telegraaf and Football International.
 Klaas-Jan Huntelaar wins the Bronze boots award.

Results
All times are in CEST

Johan Cruyff Shield

Eredivisie

Play-offs

Round 1

Round 2

KNVB Cup

UEFA Champions League

Third qualifying round

UEFA Cup

First round

Amsterdam Tournament 

Final standings of the LG Amsterdam Tournament 2007

Dubai Cup 

Final standings of the Mohammed Bin Rashid International Football Championship Dubai 2008

Friendlies

2007–08 transfers

Summer transfer window 
For a list of all Dutch football transfers in the summer window (1 July 2007 to 1 September 2007), please see List of Dutch football transfers summer 2007.

Arrivals 
 The following players moved to AFC Ajax.

Departures 
 The following players moved from AFC Ajax.

Winter transfer window 
For a list of all Dutch football transfers in the winter window (1 January 2008 to 1 February 2008) please see List of Dutch football transfers winter 2007–08.

Arrivals 
 The following players moved to AFC Ajax.

Departures 
 The following players moved from AFC Ajax.

External links 
Ajax Amsterdam Official Website in Nederlandse
UEFA Website

Ajax
AFC Ajax seasons